Aleksandr Vladimirovich Panov (born 21 September 1975) is a Russian former professional footballer who played as a striker. He spent most of his club career in Russia. At international level, he made 17 appearances scoring 4 goals for the Russia national team between 1999 and 2004.

Career
Panov was a lightweight and quick striker, nicknamed "Kolpino rocket" for his speed. Among his moments of glory are two goals in the 1999 final of the Russian Cup, when he helped Zenit to a victory, and a double against France at the Stade de France on 5 June 1999 in a 3–2 win.

After a season with the farm club of Zenit Saint Petersburg Panov debuted for the first team in 1994. Panov spent a year in Vologda and another one with Shanghai Baosteel team in Shanghai. In 1997 Panov returned to Zenit and become a first team regular, earning a national team call a year later.

In mid-2000, Panov transferred to AS Saint-Étienne but was seriously injured soon after that. He returned to Russia after failing to become a regular in Saint-Étienne or FC Lausanne-Sport (loan) and played for Dynamo Moscow, Dynamo Saint Petersburg, and Torpedo Moscow. In 2006, he returned to Zenit again and he retired after a last season at Torpedo Moscow in 2010.

International goals

Honours

Club
 Russian Cup: 1999

Individual
 Russian First Division top goalscorer: 2003 (23 goals)
 Russian First Division player of the year (according to the Professional Football League): 2003
 Russian Second Division Zone 5 top scorer: 1993 (15 goals)

Notes

External links
 Player profile 
 
 

1975 births
Living people
People from Kolpino
Russian footballers
FC Zenit-2 Saint Petersburg players
FC Zenit Saint Petersburg players
Russian Premier League players
AS Saint-Étienne players
FC Dynamo Moscow players
FC Torpedo Moscow players
FC Dynamo Saint Petersburg players
Russia international footballers
Russian expatriate sportspeople in Switzerland
Russian expatriate footballers
Expatriate footballers in China
Russian expatriate sportspeople in France
Expatriate footballers in France
Expatriate footballers in Switzerland
Russian expatriate sportspeople in China
Association football forwards
FC Dynamo Vologda players